Howard ‘Vanderhorn’ Nelson (1934-7 December 2007) was an ex-champion bodybuilder who also acted in many British sex comedies. Cast in both comedy roles as well as `heavies' due to his muscular appearance, Nelson's most regular employer was close personal friend Harrison Marks. For many years Nelson worked in Marks' Studio in Farringdon. As well as being a regular in Marks' softcore films (The Nine Ages of Nakedness, Come Play With Me), Nelson also appeared in several of Marks 8mm glamour films. Nelson also made several (non sex) appearances in various blue films made by Marks, usually wearing elaborate disguises like dark glasses and/or a blonde wig. In 1978 he appeared on the cover of Forum magazine (Vol.10, No.11) he also featured as a 'spanking milkman' in the second issue of New Janus (circa 1982), a corporal punishment magazine Marks edited.

Latterly, Howard worked for a time at Lovejoy’s Bookshop, and was occasionally spotted around the Charing Cross area. Howard Nelson died of natural causes at his South London home in December 2007, in February 2009 the Metropolitan Police launched an appeal to find any of his surviving relatives.

Partial filmography 
    Pattern of Evil (1967)....Arthur Vanderhorn
    Macabre (8mm glamour short, filmed September 1968)
    The Nine Ages of Nakedness (1969) - Sir Rupert (segment "The Cavaliers")
    Secrets of Sex (1969).... Judge's Servant (uncredited)  
 The Girl Upstairs (8mm glamour short, 1972, Dir: Harrison Marks)
 Intimacy (8mm glamour short, 197?, Dir: Ken Williams)
 The Handyman (8mm glamour short, 197?, Dir: Ken Williams)
 Landlord's Delight (8mm glamour short, 197?)
 Just the Job (8mm glamour short, 197?..... Bob, Dir: Ken Williams)
 Maid to Satisfy (8mm glamour short, 197?)
 Pleasure Maid (8mm glamour short, 197?, Dir: Ken Williams)
 Unaccustomed as I Am (8mm glamour short, 1973, Dir: Harrison Marks)
    Die Lollos aka The Customs (hardcore short 197?) .... Man at Customs Desk
    Autograph Hunter (hardcore short 197?) .... Roadie
    Duty Free (hardcore short 197?) ... Man at Customs Desk 
    The Swordsman (1974) ...Thug in Gym
    Come Play with Me (1977) ....Mr. Benjamin 
    The Playbirds (1978) ... Caped Man
    The Stud (1978) ...Sandro 
Carry On Emmannuelle (1979) -.... Harry Hernia 
 Emmanuelle and Friends (Ken Williams compilation video, released 1980) .... Big Mick the Handyman 
 Minder (1993) "No Way to treat a Daley"....Boxer (uncredited)

References

 Keeping the British End Up: Four Decades of Saucy Cinema by Simon Sheridan (fourth edition) (Titan Publishing, London) (2011)

External links 
 

English male film actors
1934 births
2007 deaths